Mahmudabad (also Romanized as Maḩmūdābād; also known as Makhmudabad) is a village in Khararud Rural District of the Central District of Khodabandeh County, Zanjan province, Iran. At the 2006 National Census, its population was 2,486 in 558 households. The following census in 2011 counted 2,906 people in 782 households. The latest census in 2016 showed a population of 2,802 people in 782 households; it was the largest village in its rural district.

References 

Khodabandeh County

Populated places in Zanjan Province

Populated places in Khodabandeh County